Pleosporaceae is a family of sac fungi.  The taxonomic relationship of this family to associated genera is still not determined.

Genera
As accepted by GBIF;
 Acrothecium  (13)
 Alternaria Nees ex Wallroth, 1816 (841)
 Alternariaster  (14)
 Bipolaris Shoemaker (179)
 Briansuttonomyces (1)
 Chalastospora  (6)
 Cleistotheca (1)
 Cochliobolus  (45)
 Crivellia Shoemaker & Inderbitzin
 Curvularia  (497)
 Decorospora (Pat.) Inderbitzin, Kohlm. & Volkm.-Kohlm, 2002 (3)
 Dichotomophthora Mehrl. & Fitzp. ex M.B.Ellis, 1971 (17)
 Drechslera  (36)
 Edenia  (5)
 Embellisia  (3)
 Exserohilum K.J. Leonard & Suggs (113)
 Extrawettsteinina M.E. Barr (2)
 Gibbago  (2)
 Halokirschsteiniothelia  (3)
 Johnalcornia  (4)
 Kriegeriella Höhn (4)
 Lewia M.E. Barr & E.G. Simmons
 Macrospora Fuckel (2)
 Macrosporium  (28)
 Malustela (1)
 Mycoporopsis  (12)
 Neocamarosporium  (40)
 Paradendryphiella  (2)
 Paraliomyces  (2)
 Platysporoides (Wehm.) Shoemaker & C.E. Babc. (12)
 Pleospora Rabenh. ex Ces. & De Not., 1863 (458)
 Porocercospora  (12)
 Pseudoyuconia Lar. N. Vailjeva (1)
 Pyrenophora Fr., 1849 (133)
 Scleroplea (1)
 Setosphaeria K.J. Leonard & Suggs, 1974 (30)
 Sinomyces  (2)
 Stemphylium  (131)
 Tamaricicola (1)
 Teretispora  (2)
 Thalassoascus  (3)
 Tremateia  (6)
 Typhicola  (2)
 Wettsteinina  (48)

Figures in brackets are approx. how many species per genus.

References

External links
 ITIS Pleosporaceae

 
Dothideomycetes families